The Singing Buckaroo is a 1937 American Western film written and directed by Tom Gibson. The film stars Fred Scott, Victoria Vinton, William Faversham, Cliff Nazarro, Howard Hill and Charles Kaley. The film was released on January 15, 1937, by Spectrum Pictures.

Plot

Cast           
Fred Scott as Grant Gordon
Victoria Vinton as Barbara Evans
William Faversham as Dad Evans
Cliff Nazarro as Gabby
Howard Hill as Maneeto 
Charles Kaley as Sam Gifford
Roger Williams as Red
Dick Curtis as Odie 
Ed Cassidy as Fake Deputy 
Rosa Caprino as Wotonna

References

External links
 

1937 films
American Western (genre) films
1937 Western (genre) films
American black-and-white films
1930s English-language films
1930s American films